GIHOC Distilleries Company Limited was first modern distillery company to be established in West Africa. It was established by the pre-independence Industrial Development Corporation (IDC) in 1958 as the State Distilleries Corporation for the manufacture of alcoholic beverages. The managing director of GIHOC Distilleries Company Limited is Maxwell Kofi Jumah.

History 
GIHOC Distilleries Company Limited was established in 1958 as the State Distilleries Corporation for the manufacture of alcoholic beverages.

After a decade of establishing GIHOC, in 1968, it became a division of the then Ghana Industrial Holding Corporation (GIHOC). In 1993, GIHOC Distilleries became and still remains a limited liability company wholly owned by the Government of Ghana.

In 2014, Mrs Kay Kwao-Simmonds who worked as the Managing Director of GIHOC distilleries company Ltd, (Apr 2010 – Jun 2017), stated that the company hope to expand into neighbouring Togo and Cote D’Ivoire by the end of the year 2015. Additionally, she said ”the company already has three of its products on the Nigeria market”.

Operations 
In the opening month of the year 2020, Ghana Industrial Holding Corporation (GIHOC) has its operation in 16 regions within Ghana.

Currently, Ghana Industrial Holding Corporation (GIHOC) has its operations in Liberia, Nigeria and Cote d'Ivoire. In January 2020, the managing director of GIHOC Distilleries Company Limited, Maxwell Kofi Jumah informed the press that: "GIHOC's South Africa will become operational in the month of February 2020 as processes leading to the official commissioning of the China and USA offices near completion."

References

External links 
 Official website

Drink companies of Ghana
Distilleries